Wargaming is a form of gaming that realistically represents warfare.

Wargaming may also refer to:
Military wargaming
Wargaming (company), a Belarusian multinational game developer and publisher headquartered in Nicosia, Cyprus
Wargaming Chicago-Baltimore, an American game developer that operates in Chicago, Illinois and Hunt Valley, Maryland
Wargaming Seattle, a closed video game developer located in Redmond, Washington that was formerly known as Gas Powered Games

See also
War game (disambiguation)